Kareem Al Allaf (born 22 March 1998) is an American tennis player of Syrian descent.

Allaf has a career high ATP singles ranking of 755 achieved on 27 December 2022. He also has a career high ATP doubles ranking of 1333 achieved on 2 December 2019. Allaf also holds the all-time wins record for singles and doubles combined in college tennis at the University of Iowa.

Allaf represented Syria at the Davis Cup, where he had a W/L record of 18–9. He switched nationalities to represent his birth country, the United States, after being banned by the Syrian Tennis Federation for competing in a match against an Israeli opponent in a tournament in November 2022.

References

External links

1998 births
Living people
Syrian male tennis players
American male tennis players
Sportspeople from Des Moines, Iowa
Sportspeople from Dubai
Iowa Hawkeyes men's tennis players